James Smith (20 March 1880 – 18 June 1958) was an Australian cricketer. He played two first-class matches for New South Wales in 1909/10.

See also
 List of New South Wales representative cricketers

References

External links
 

1880 births
1958 deaths
Australian cricketers
New South Wales cricketers
Cricketers from Sydney